Aledo may refer to:

Aledo, Illinois
Aledo, Texas
Aledo, Spain